Bekal is a small town in the Kasaragod district on the West coast of the state of Kerala, India.

Location
Bekal Fort is the largest fort in Kerala state situated adjacent to the beach. Shaped like a giant keyhole, the historic Bekal Fort offers a view of the Arabian Sea from its tall observation towers, which had huge cannons a couple centuries ago. 

The state of Kerala is reviewing a plan to start seaplane services connecting Bekal with Kollam Ashtamudi, Kumarakom, Punnamada and famous Paravur backwaters. Bekal in Northern Kerala was one of the top ten travel destinations selected by Lonely Planet.

Local roads have access to NH 66 which connects to Mangalore in the north and Calicut in the south. The nearest railway station is Kanhangad on Mangalore-Palakkad line. There are airports at Mangalore and Calicut And Kannur.

Transportation
Kerala State Highway connecting to Kasaragod in the north and Kanhangad in the south. The nearest railway station is Bekal Fort Railway Station, Kotikulam Railway Station and Kanhangad Railway Station on Mangalore-Palakkad line. There are airports at Mangalore, Kannur and Calicut.

References

External links

 Bekal Travel Guide swantour.com on 03-Aug-2019
 Official Website of the District Administration
 Official Website of the Bekal Resorts Development Corporation Ltd (BRDC)

Kanhangad area